Mordellistena candelabra is a beetle in the genus Mordellistena of the family Mordellidae. It was described in 1939 by Ray.

References

candelabra
Beetles described in 1939